Popular Unity - Insubordinate Left (Laïkí Enótita, LAE - ΑΑ) is a left-wing political party in Greece.

Popular Unity was founded on 21 August 2015 by twenty five parliamentarians formerly affiliated to the Coalition of the Radical Left (Syriza), as a reaction to Prime Minister Alexis Tsipras' handling of the Greek bailout agreement of 2015. It is led by the former Minister of Energy Panagiotis Lafazanis. Due to receiving 2.86% (vs. the required 3%) of the popular vote in the September 2015 election it has no seats in the Parliament.

History
Popular Unity was founded on 21 August 2015 by 25 parliamentarians formerly affiliated to the Coalition of the Radical Left (Syriza), as a reaction to Prime Minister Alexis Tsipras' handling of the Greek bailout agreement of 2015. At foundation Popular Unity was the third largest party in the Greek parliament. It is led by the former Minister of Energy in the Tsipras cabinet, Panagiotis Lafazanis. Dimitris Stratoulis (former Alternate Minister of Social Security) and Costas Isychos (former Alternate Minister of National Defence), who were sacked in July 2015, also joined the new party.

Election September 2015
On 2 September 2015, the party programme for the snap election on September 20 was published. The party received about 2.9% of the vote, below the 3% threshold to win any seats in parliament. In response to the result the party said, 'we lost the game but not the war'.

In the 2023 legislative elections, the party joined forces with MeRA25.

Naming
The name of the party is inspired by Popular Unity, the Chilean political alliance led by Salvador Allende.

Policies
The party favours Greek withdrawal from the eurozone and reinstating the drachma as Greece's national currency. According to founding member Stathis Kouvelakis, a former member of Syriza's Central Committee, the new party supports socialist internationalism, pacifism, Greece's exit from NATO, and breaking military agreements with Israel.

Election results

Hellenic Parliament

European Parliament

Members of Parliament
Popular Unity had 26 members of the Hellenic Parliament prior to the September 2015 election, all of whom defected from Syriza. In alphabetical order, they were:
 
 
 
 Kostas Delimitros
 
 
 Ilias Ioannidis
 Kostas Isihos
 Thomas Kotsias
 
  
 Aglaia Kyritsi
 Panagiotis Lafazanis
 Costas Lapavitsas
 Stathis Leoutsakos
 
 
 Thanasis Petrakos
 Elena Psarrea
 Stefanos Samoilis
 Thanasis Skoumas
 
 
 Alexandra Tsanaka
 Nadia Valavani
 
 Ioannis Zerdelis

References

External links 
  
 Iskra
 Plan B
 The R Project

Left-wing politics in Greece
2015 establishments in Greece
Anti-capitalist political parties
Left-wing nationalist parties
Eurosceptic parties in Greece
Parties represented in the European Parliament
Political parties established in 2015
Political schisms
Socialist parties in Greece
Syriza
Left-wing parties
Far-left politics in Greece
Far-left political parties